Mesa is an unincorporated community and a U.S. Post Office located in Mesa County, Colorado, United States.

Description
The Mesa Post Office has the ZIP Code 81643.
Mesa is located on the north side of the Grand Mesa on state highway 65. in a geographic area known as Plateau Valley, and is under the Plateau Valley 50 District Public Schools.

Geography
Mesa is located at  (39.166271,-108.138943).

See also

References

External links

Unincorporated communities in Mesa County, Colorado
Unincorporated communities in Colorado